Charles Ernest Burland Cranfield,  (13 September 1915 – 27 February 2015) was a British theologian, academic, and Christian minister.

Biography
Cranfield was born in Winchmore Hill, London on 13 September 1915 to parents Charles Ernest Cranfield (a town clerk and Methodist preacher) and Beatrice Mary, née Tubbs (an artist). Cranfield attended Mill Hill School and gained a first class degree in classics in 1936 from Jesus College, Cambridge. he went on to study Theology at Wesley House, Cambridge until 1939.

He was ordained as a Methodist minister in 1941, served as a military chaplain during the Second World War, and then worked with prisoners-of-war and as a parish minister during the post-war period. He moved into academia and was appointment a lecturer in theology at the University of Durham in 1950. He was awarded a personal chair as Professor of Theology in 1978, and maintained his links with the university as Emeritus Professor from his retirement in 1980. He moved away from Methodism and became a minister in the Presbyterian Church of England (which later became the United Reformed Church) in 1954.

On 7 April 1953, Cranfield married Ruth Elizabeth Gertrude Bole in Bath. They had twin daughters who both went on to become Church of Scotland ministers. Cranfield died on 27 February 2015 as a result of pneumonia and was buried at South Road Cemetery.

Honours
In 1982, Cranfield was elected a Fellow of the British Academy (FBA), the United Kingdom's national academy for the humanities and social sciences. He was awarded the 1989 Burkitt Medal for Biblical Studies by the British Academy.

Works

References

1915 births
2015 deaths
20th-century British theologians
New Testament scholars
British Methodist ministers
United Reformed Church ministers
Academics of Durham University
World War II chaplains
Fellows of the British Academy